Mohamed "Yôrôbô" Bangoura (born 14 March 1996) is a Guinean footballer who plays as a left-back for Kamsar and the Guinea national team.

International career
Bangoura made his debut with the Guinea national team in a 2–1 2018 African Nations Championship qualification win over Sudan on 14 January 2018.

External links
 
 NFT Profile

References

1996 births
Living people
Sportspeople from Conakry
Guinean footballers
Guinea international footballers
Association football fullbacks
Satellite FC players
Horoya AC players
AS Kaloum Star players
Santoba FC players
Guinée Championnat National players
Guinea A' international footballers
2018 African Nations Championship players
2020 African Nations Championship players